The Berlin Brigade was a US Army brigade-sized garrison based in West Berlin during the Cold War. After the end of World War II, under the conditions of the Yalta and Potsdam agreements, the Allied forces occupied West Berlin. This occupation lasted throughout the Cold War. The French Army also had units in Berlin, called Forces Françaises à Berlin and the British Army's unit in Berlin was the Berlin Infantry Brigade.

History
The Berlin Brigade of the United States Army was a separate brigade based in Berlin. Its shoulder sleeve insignia was the U.S. Army Europe patch with a Berlin tab, later incorporated.

The Brigade was based across four large installations in Steglitz-Zehlendorf: McNair, Andrews, Roosevelt and Turner barracks.

During the Berlin Wall Crisis of 1961, the Army reorganized the command structure of the forces in Berlin and created the U.S. Army Berlin and created the Berlin Brigade from the units already in the city. The 6th Infantry Regiment, active in Germany since 1950, was reorganized in mid-1958 according to the Pentomic structure: Each battle group consisted of five line (rifle) companies, a combat support company, and a headquarters & headquarters company. The Berlin Brigade had the 2nd and 3d Battle Groups, 6th Infantry until 1963, when Army force structure abandoned battle groups in favor of brigades and subordinate battalions.

The reorganized brigade consisted of the following units:
2d Battalion, 6th Infantry
3d Battalion, 6th Infantry
4th Battalion, 18th Infantry (reflagged on 13 September 1972 as the 4th Battalion, 6th Infantry)
Battery C, 94th Field Artillery 
Company F (later 6th Battalion), 40th Armor (Turner Barracks)
42d Engineer Company
42d AG Unit (Postal)
42d Military Police Group (Customs) (attached elements)
287th Military Police Company (Separate)
43d Chemical Detachment
76th Chemical Detachment
279th Station Hospital (became US Army Hospital Berlin in 1976)
168th Medical Detachment (Veterinary Service)
592d Signal Company
298th Army Band
AFN Europe AM FM TV
Rail Transportation Office (RTO) (Berlin Licherfelde West train station)
Berlin Brigade Aviation Detachment (Tempelhof Central Airport)
US Army Engineers-DEH Detachment Engineering & Housing (Von Steuben compound)
US Military Liaison Mission Potsdam -USMLM
Detachment A - 39th Special Forces Detachment (1956-1984)

The 168th and 298th share the distinction of being the longest-serving units in Berlin. They both arrived in the city in a 37-vehicle convoy on 3 July 1945. The commanders of both units were old high school classmates.

The brigade's infantry battalions were reflagged again in 1984 as the 4th, 5th and 6th Battalions, 502nd Infantry, and Battery C, 94th FA was reflagged as Battery E, 320th Field Artillery.

From 1947 to 1987, brigade soldiers were tasked with month-long rotations at Spandau Prison. These rotations, shared with British, French and Soviet soldiers, continued until Spandau's last prisoner, Rudolf Hess, died in 1987.

Until the end of the Cold War, members of the brigade were eligible for the Army of Occupation Medal with Germany clasp. Because of the legal status of West Berlin, it was technically occupied territory left over from World War II.

During the early 1980s, the U.S. Army Regimental System initiative renamed a large percentage of infantry, armor and artillery battalions to align overseas commands with units assigned to stateside brigades, reinforcing the Army's regimental designations and unit morale. The original intent was to initiate personnel replacement and rotations within regiments, a "next step" that did not provide sufficient flexibility to Army personnel managers. The impact on Berlin-based infantry battalions was to reflag the 2nd, 3rd and 4th Battalions, 6th Infantry as the 4th, 5th and 6th Battalions, 502nd Infantry, respectively, during the summer of 1984, assigning Berlin infantry units a shared identification with infantry battalions of 2d Brigade, 101st Airborne Division (Air Assault) at Fort Campbell, Kentucky.

When the Berlin Wall fell in 1989, the operational structure of the Brigade was as follows:
 Berlin Brigade
 4th Bn, 502d Infantry, (6x M106, 12x M901, 14x M113, 8x M125)
 5th Bn, 502d Infantry, (6x M106, 12x M901, 14x M113, 8x M125)
 6th Bn, 502d Infantry, (6x M106, 12x M901, 14x M113, 8x M125)
 Combat Support Battalion
 HHC, (2x M1A1)
 Company D, 40th Armor, (14x M1A1)
 Company F, 40th Armor, (14x M1A1)
 Battery E, 320th Field Artillery, (8x M109A3)
 42d Engineer Company (3x M728 CEV)
 42d Postal Unit
 287th Military Police Company
 298th Army Band
 AFN Europe AM FM TV
 43d Chemical Detachment
 766th Military Intelligence Detachment
 Berlin Brigade Aviation Detachment (6x Bell UH-1H, 2x Pilatus UV-20A Chiricahua, 1x Beechcraft C-12C Huron)
 US Military Liaison Mission Potsdam -USMLM
 US Army Signal Support Company
 US Army Physical Security Support Element -PSSE - 410th Special Forces Detachment (1984-1990)

Individual members of the brigade with Intelligence specialties from 766th Military Intelligence Detachment & Field Station Berlin, deployed to Operations Desert Shield and Desert Storm in 1990–1991, filling shortfalls for other units in USAREUR. Members of the 42nd Engineer deployed as truck drivers for trucks donated from other countries to support force transportation requirements. Other soldiers from throughout the brigade also applied for transfer and back-filled several USAREUR units deploying to Saudi Arabia.

With the end of the Cold War and the drawdown of forces in Western Europe, the brigade began a drawdown in late 1990, with the inactivation of 4th Battalion, 502nd Infantry Regiment. In early 1991, elements of the Combat Support Battalion were inactivated, such as the 43rd Chemical Detachment and personnel consolidated. Echo Battery/320th Field Artillery swapped its M-109A3 (155mmm) self-propelled guns for M-102 (105mm) howitzers. The intent was to make the brigade lighter and easier to respond to a spectrum of operations. In the Spring of 1992, the M-1 Abrams tanks of 6th Battalion, 40th Armor were rail headed out of Berlin, battalion inactivated thus Turner Barracks ceased functions and remained so until it was demolished in the late 1990's being replaced by an apartment complex. 

The first Berlin Brigade units to take part in an out-of-theater operation were the command-and-staff element of Headquarters and Headquarters Company (HHC), as well as Company B, 6th Battalion, 502nd Infantry and the 42d Engineer Company. These units were later joined by the members of the 42d AG Unit (Postal). These units served in Operation Provide Comfort II, a relief and protection mission for Iraqi Kurds. They served with a multinational "Allied Ground Combat Force" that also included British, French, Italian, Dutch, and Turkish infantry companies. Based in Silopi, Turkey, near the Iraqi border, from July to October 1991, these ground forces were soon withdrawn to avoid entanglement in the local Turkish-PKK conflict and because it was decided that the US Air Force presence at Incirlik constituted an adequate deterrent to Iraqi attempts at encroaching on the Kurdish autonomous zone. Soldiers of this task force were authorized to wear the Berlin Brigade shoulder sleeve insignia as a combat patch on the right shoulder of their uniform, the first and only time elements of the Berlin Brigade were authorized to do so.

Elements of the Berlin Brigade were the first combat units selected to deploy as a member of the United Nations Protectionary Forces (UNPROFOR) to Macedonia in July 1993; later to be renamed Task Force Able Sentry.

The Brigade was awarded the Army Superior Unit Award for the period of 30 Sep 93 - 15 May 94, under General Order 1994-27.

Under the treaties that enabled the reunification of Germany, all non-German military forces were required to leave Berlin. The Berlin Brigade was officially inactivated by President Bill Clinton on 6 July 1994. The last unit to leave Berlin was the 42nd AG Unit (Postal). The 42nd was a small unit responsible for the mail service for the military assigned to Berlin, the Potsdam unit, and the Helmstedt detachment. It received very little recognition but was vital to the morale of the brigade. Besides postal service, the unit also performed other services, such as courier duty throughout the European theater. The unit was based at Andrews Barracks under Special Troops.

Historical notes

The 287th Military Police Company was the only US Army MP unit to use boats for water patrol along the border to East Germany.

The Berlin Brigade Aviation Detachment at Tempelhof Central Airport was the last US Army unit worldwide to use the DeHavilland Canada U-6 Beaver, when retired in January 1980.
Its replacement was the UV-20A Chiricahua (two delivered in 1979), for which the unit was also the first and until 1991 only operator within the US Army.

The Rail Transportation Office operated the only regular US Army Transportation Corps trains (between West Berlin and West Germany) through a communist controlled country for 45 years, pulled by East German Deutsche Reichsbahn locomotives.

See also
 Forces Françaises à Berlin
 Berlin Infantry Brigade

References

Bibliography 
William Durie, "The United States Garrison Berlin 1945-1994", Aug 2014, .
AMTLICH GEWONNEN; considering the spirit during the Berlin Wall period, including a dedication to the former personnel of 7350th Air Base Group, Großek, Michael (2012) 
Kevin Wright and Peter Jefferies "Looking down the corridors-Allied aerial espionage over East Germany and Berlin 1945-1990",2015, .

External links

 USA 6941st Guard Veterans Association
 248 German Security Unit Veterans Association
 Allied Museum Berlin
 History of the French, American and British Berlin Brigades
 Berlin Brigade - McNair Barracks
 Berlin 1969 – the Allies in Berlin at midpoint of the Cold War
 Co F 40th Armor site by Bob Decker.
 Berlin U.S. Military Veterans Association (BUSMVA) website
 Berlin-Brigade Installations

 BerlinBrigade.com Dedicated to all that served in West Berlin from 1945 to 1994
  USMLM recce flights in the Berlin Control Zone BCZ

Cold War military history of Germany
Infantry brigades of the United States Army
Military units and formations established in 1961
Allied occupation of Germany
West Berlin